George Daniel may refer to:

George Daniel (lacrosse), Commissioner of the National Lacrosse League
George M. Daniel (born 1978), fly fisherman
George Daniel (writer) (1789–1864), English miscellaneous writer and book collector
George Daniel (drummer), drummer in the English band The 1975

See also

George Daniels (disambiguation)
Daniel George (disambiguation)